1991 Soviet Lower Second League was the second and the last season of the Soviet Second League B since its reestablishing in 1990. The league was divided into 10 zones (groups) with 217 participants.

At least four out those 10 zones were part of republican championships. Among those republics were Ukrainian SSR, Armenian SSR, Azerbaijani SSR, and Kazakh SSR. Five more zones were dominated majorly by clubs of the Russian SFSR and one more zone was a collective competition among clubs of the Central Asia less the Kazakh SSR.

Four former Soviet republics that technically were still part of the Soviet Union conducted separate competitions. Among those republics were Baltic republics Estonian SSR, Latvian SSR, and Lithuanian SSR as well as Georgian SSR. An attempt to conduct separate Soviet Baltic League that conducted in 1990 fell through and separate Baltic clubs (predominantly from the Latvian SSR) were allowed to compete in regular league competitions of the Soviet Union.

Political situation
The Soviet football competitions were conducted with the ongoing Nagorno-Karabakh conflict between the Soviet Armenia and the Soviet Azerbaijan. Because of that some clubs that territorially were located in the Azerbaijani SSR (i.e. Artsakh Stepanakert from Stepanakert) were nonetheless allowed to compete in republican championship of the Armenian SSR.

Following the end of the football season, in the Moldavian SSR started a hot phase of the Transnistria conflict that was initiated by Soviet authorities led by Igor Smirnov and supported by the Odessa Military District authorities. At the same time political situations in Tajikistan and Georgia following their first presidential elections were deteriorating and escalated into so called Georgian Civil War and Tajikistani Civil War with a direct intervention of the Russian Armed Forces.

In December 1991 there was signed Belavezha Accords between representatives of Russia, Belarus, and Ukraine.

Final standings

I Zone (Ukraine)

II Zone (Armenia)

III Zone (Azerbaijan)

IV Zone (South Russia)

V Zone (Center)

VI Zone (North Russia and Moscow)

VII Zone (Ural)

VIII Zone (Kazakhstan)

IX Zone (Central Asia)

X Zone (Russia Far East)

See also
 Soviet Second League B

External links
 1991 Soviet Championship and Cup

Soviet Second League B seasons
4
Soviet
Soviet
1991 in Russian football leagues
1991 in Armenian football
1991 in Belarusian football
1991 in Kazakhstani football
1991 in Kyrgyzstani football
1991 in Latvian football
1991–92 in Moldovan football
1991 in Tajikistani football
1991 in Turkmenistani sport
1991 in Ukrainian association football leagues
1991 in Uzbekistani football
1
1